Walter Hadye Lin̄i (1942 – 21 February 1999) was a Raga Anglican priest and politician who was the first Prime Minister of Vanuatu, from independence in 1980 to 1991. He was born at Agatoa village, Pentecost Island. On his mother's side, he was a descendant of the high chief Virasangvulu, while on his father's side, he was descended from the famous weaver, Nuenue, as well as from the high chief Viralalau.

Lini was a key figure in Vanuatu's struggle for independence. He was a key proponent of Melanesian socialism.

Early life
Lin̄i started school at the age of five when he attended the Australian Missionary Sunday School at Lamalanga on North Pentecost. In 1950, he began attending Nazareth School at Agatoa.  From there, he attended Vureas School on Aoba. After finishing school, Lin̄i worked in the Anglican Diocesan office at Lolowai, before undertaking theological training at St Peter's College in Siota, Solomon Islands and St John's College, Auckland.  

After returning from  his studies in New Zealand, Lin̄i, along with Donald Kalpokas and John Bani, formed the New Hebrides Cultural Association and launched its mouthpiece newspaper, New Hebrides Viewpoint. At that time, New Hebrides was a condominium ruled by the United Kingdom and France. Soon after the formation of the New Hebrides Cultural Association, Lin̄i and others formed the New Hebrides National Party (NHNP), with Lin̄i responsible for publishing the newspaper as well as recruiting party members on Aoba, North Pentecost and Maewo. In 1974, the Party Congress elected Lin̄i as full-time national president of the party, with Fred Timakata vice-president. In May, 1974, Lin̄i addressed the United Nations Committee of 24 on decolonisation, and called for independence for the New Hebrides by 1977.

Political career
Lin̄i was instrumental in the NHNP changing its name to the Vanua'aku Pati (VP). He was elected Chief Minister following the VP's victory in the 1979 New Hebridean general election, and ascended to the position of Prime Minister upon Vanuatu's independence on July 30, 1980. 

Lin̄i went on to lead the VP to victory in the 1983 and the 1987 general elections.

Lini suffered a stroke in 1987 but subsequently remained active in politics.

Lin̄i's administration was very controversial in because of its ties with the Eastern Bloc, Libya, and other communist and socialist countries viewed with disdain by the United States and its staunch opposition to nuclear testing in the region. He was the primary advocate of Melanesian socialism. Lini was a critic of Western market economies, arguing that they caused poverty in the Third World. Vanuatu was a part of the non-aligned movement. Vanuatu provided support to the Kanak indigenous independence movement in New Caledonia and was the only country in the region to support the independence of East Timor, then under Indonesian occupation, to self-determination. 

In 1988, President Ati George Sokomanu sought unsuccessfully to remove Lini from office.

His term ended in 1991, due to factionalism within his party. He joined the National United Party, of which he was leader at the time of his death. 

He died of an illness in Vanuatu's capital Port Vila.

Personal life 
His sister, Hilda Lin̄i, and brother, Ham Lin̄i, are also politicians in Vanuatu. His sister Heather Lin̄i-Leo Matas was the first indigenous female lawyer in the country.

See also
 Coconut War
 Melanesian socialism

Notes

References

Footnotes

Bibliography
 Stuart, Andrew.  Of Cargoes, Colonies and Kings: Diplomatic and Administrative Service from Africa to the Pacific, Radcliffe Press, 2009.
 Robie, David.  Blood on their Banner : Nationalist Struggles in the South Pacific, Zed Books, 1990.
 Premadas, Ralph R.  Melanesian socialism: Vanuatu's quest for self-definition (Discussion paper series / Centre for Developing-Area Studies), McGill University, 1986.
 Lin̄i, Walter.  Beyond pandemonium: From the New Hebrides to Vanuatu.  Asia Pacific Books, 1980.
 Lin̄i, Walter, ed.  Vanuatu: Twenti Wan Tingting Long Team Blong Independents, Institute of Pacific Studies, 1980.
 Shears, Richard. The Coconut War: The Crisis on Espiritu Santo, Cassel, 1980.
 Tabani, Marc. 2000. "Walter Lin̄i, la coutume de Vanuatu et le Socialisme Mélanésien". Journal de la Société des Océanistes 111(2): 173–195.

Prime Ministers of Vanuatu
Presidents of Vanuatu
Vanuatuan Anglican priests
Vanua'aku Pati politicians
Vanuatuan socialists
1942 births
1999 deaths
History of Vanuatu
People from Penama Province
1970s in Vanuatu
1980s in Vanuatu
Anglican socialists
Oceanian Christian socialists
Members of the Parliament of Vanuatu